Gyeongju station (formerly Singyeongju station) is a station near the city of Gyeongju. It is on the Gyeongbu KTX Line and Donghae Line. Singyeongju station means "new Gyeongju station".

References

External links

 Cyber station information from Korail

Railway stations in North Gyeongsang Province
Gyeongju
Railway stations opened in 2010
Korea Train Express stations
2010 establishments in South Korea